The women's 200 metre backstroke event at the 2016 Summer Olympics took place on 11–12 August at the Olympic Aquatics Stadium.

Summary
U.S. swimmer Maya DiRado saved her best race for last before retiring from the sport, as she upset Hungary's Katinka Hosszú on the home stretch to claim the distance backstroke title. Coming from behind at the 150-metre turn, DiRado produced a late surge to touch out the Hungarian favorite by six hundredths of a second for the gold medal in 2:05.99. Hosszú commanded a solid lead through the first half of the race, but she was unable to hold off DiRado about the midway of the final lap, leaving with a silver in 2:06.05. Meanwhile, Canada's Hilary Caldwell swam her way into the bronze-medal position with a 2:07.54.

Russia's Daria Ustinova, who was allowed to compete in Rio after successfully appealing from her doping ban, obtained the fourth spot in 2:07.89, edging out Australia's Belinda Hocking (2:08.02) to fifth by 0.13 of a second. Zimbabwe's Kirsty Coventry, a five-time Olympian and double gold medalist in this event, capped off her illustrious Olympic career with a sixth-place finish in 2:08.80. Chinese teenager Liu Yaxin (2:09.03) and Iceland's Eygló Ósk Gústafsdóttir (2:09.44) rounded out the top eight.

World-record holder Missy Franklin missed the opportunity to defend her Olympic title in the final, after placing fourteenth in the semifinals (2:09.74). Other notable swimmers failed to reach the top eight roster, including Hocking's teammate and reigning world champion Emily Seebohm, London 2012 silver medalist Anastasia Fesikova of Russia, and Ukraine's Daryna Zevina, runner-up at the European Championships two months earlier.

Records
Prior to this competition, the existing world and Olympic records were as follows.

Competition format

The competition consisted of three rounds: heats, semifinals, and a final. The swimmers with the best 16 times in the heats advanced to the semifinals. The swimmers with the best 8 times in the semifinals advanced to the final. Swim-offs were used as necessary to break ties for advancement to the next round.

Results

Heats

Semifinals

Semifinal 1

Semifinal 2

Final

References

Women's 00200 metre backstroke
Olympics
2016 in women's swimming
Women's events at the 2016 Summer Olympics